Joven, viuda y estanciera may refer to:

Joven, viuda y estanciera (1941 film), an Argentine film
Joven, viuda y estanciera (1970 film), an Argentine film